The 1989 Newfoundland general election was held on April 20, 1989 to elect members of the 41st General Assembly of Newfoundland. It was won by the Liberal party despite polling fewer votes than the Conservatives.

Unusually, however, Liberal leader Clyde Wells was defeated by Lynn Verge in his own riding of Humber East despite having led his party to victory. Consequently, a member of his caucus, Eddie Joyce, resigned shortly after the election, and Wells was acclaimed to office in the riding of Bay of Islands. Seven years later, Verge was the leader of the Progressive Conservatives during the 1996 election, and she also lost Humber East in the election, though her party did not win that election.

Results

References

External links
 Election Report

Further reading
 

Elections in Newfoundland and Labrador
1989 elections in Canada
1989 in Newfoundland and Labrador
April 1989 events in Canada